Pietro Martellanza (30 September 1938 – 1 February 2010), best known as Peter Martell, was an Italian film actor who had numerous bigger roles in Spaghetti westerns. Sometimes he was credited as Pete Martell or Peter Martel.

Born in Bolzano, he started his career in cinema as a stuntman. He was mainly active in the 1960s and 1970s, appearing in about 70 films. After a longer break he starred in some movies again from 2002 on.

Martell was chosen as the leading actor in God Forgives... I Don't!, but the day before the first shoot he broke his foot during a fight with his girlfriend and was replaced by Terence Hill, which started Hill's successful partnership with Bud Spencer. Martell was set to play Trinity when They Call Me Trinity (1970) was first announced, and George Eastman Bambino. The two characters were later portrayed by Terence Hill and Bud Spencer, who were then a popular comic duo following the release of Western film God Forgives... I Don't!.

Filmography

References

Works cited

External links 
 

Italian male film actors
1938 births
2010 deaths
Actors from Bolzano
Male Spaghetti Western actors